Kamilė Vaičiulaitytė (born 18 August 1994) is a Lithuanian footballer who plays as a forward and has appeared for the Lithuania women's national team.

Career
Vaičiulaitytė has been capped for the Lithuania national team, appearing for the team during the 2019 FIFA Women's World Cup qualifying cycle.

References

External links
 
 
 

1994 births
Living people
Women's association football forwards
Lithuanian women's footballers
Lithuania women's international footballers
Gintra Universitetas players